Paola Alejandra Tapia Salas (born 9 August 1975) is a Chilean politician and lawyer who served as Minister of Transport and Telecommunications.

References

External links
 

1975 births
Living people
Pontifical Catholic University of Chile alumni
21st-century Chilean politicians
21st-century Chilean women politicians
Government ministers of Chile
Women government ministers of Chile